This article shows all roster of the women's volleyball tournament at the 2011 Pan Arab Games that was held in Doha, Qatar from December 10 to 21, 2011. In this women's 5 teams participated.











References

2011
2011 in women's volleyball
Women's volleyball squads